The danger zone is the temperature range in which food-borne bacteria can grow. The FSIS stipulates that potentially hazardous food should not be stored at temperatures in this range in order to prevent foodborne illness (for example, a refrigerator's temperature must be kept below ), and that food that remains in this zone for more than two hours should not be consumed. In the UK and NI, the Danger Zone is defined as 8 °C - 63 °C 

Food-borne bacteria, in large enough numbers, may cause food poisoning, symptoms similar to gastroenteritis or "stomach flu" (a misnomer, as true influenza primarily affects the respiratory system).  Some of the symptoms include stomach cramps, nausea, vomiting, diarrhea, and fever. Food-borne illness becomes more dangerous in certain populations, such as people with weakened immune systems, young children, the elderly, and pregnant women.  In Canada, there are approximately 4 million cases of food-borne disease per year. These symptoms can begin as early as shortly after and as late as weeks after consumption of the contaminated food.

Time and temperature control plays a critical role in food safety. To prevent time-temperature abuse, the amount of time food spends in the danger zone must be minimized. A logarithmic relationship exists between microbial cell death and temperature, that is, a small decrease of cooking temperature can result in considerable numbers of cells surviving the process. In addition to reducing the time spent in the danger zone, foods should be moved through the danger zone as few times as possible when reheating or cooling.

Foods that are potentially hazardous inside the danger zone:
 Meat: beef, poultry, pork, seafood
 Eggs and other protein-rich foods
 Dairy products
 Cut or peeled fresh produce
 Cooked vegetables, beans, rice, pasta
 Sauces, such as gravy
 Sprouts
 Any foods containing the above, e.g. casseroles, salads, quiches

According to Bryan (2004), a more complex, but more comprehensive picture of food safety hazards can be given by full consideration of the many factors involved. He advocates seeing the danger zone as "a series of ranges that represent different degrees of hazards and risks." He presents the danger zone in a chart of time versus temperature as having a zone of high danger in which foods are at temperatures between 30C and 45C for several hours, surrounded by two zones of lesser danger involving exposure at lower temperatures for longer periods of time.

See also 
 Food safety
 
 }£]£]{$}$

References

Food safety